John L. Rotz (December 16, 1934 – July 12, 2021) was an American Thoroughbred horse racing jockey and a World Champion in Western riding competitions.

Early career
After graduating from Warrensburg-Latham High School in Illinois in 1952, Rotz went to work at Fairmount Park Racetrack in Collinsville, Illinois. After working as a groom, hot walker, and exercise rider, he began riding professionally in 1953. Nicknamed "Gentleman John" because of his polite demeanor, he gained a reputation for being able to handle temperamental Thoroughbreds.

Riding career
During a 20-year riding career, Rotz won many of the most important races across the United States. In 1969 and 1970, he won more stakes races than any other jockey in American racing. He earned two wins in the American Classic Races, the first coming in 1962 when he rode Greek Money to victory in the Preakness Stakes. A year earlier, he finished second in the Preakness aboard Globemaster and earned another second-place finish in 1968 with King Ranch's Out of the Way. He got his second Classic race win aboard High Echelon in the 1970 Belmont Stakes.

In 1973, Rotz was voted the George Woolf Memorial Jockey Award, given to a jockey in North America who demonstrates high standards of personal and professional conduct, on and off the racetrack. He retired from riding that year following surgery for a foot injury, but he remained active in the industry, working for ten years as a racing steward at various racetracks in Louisiana, Ohio, Delaware, and New York. While working at Thistledown Racecourse in North Randall, Ohio in 1975, he met his wife, Mary, whose sister was a horse trainer at the track.

Retirement
Rotz retired as a racing steward on March 31, 1983. He and his wife returned to his native Warrensburg, Illinois where they purchased a  farm. Mary Rotz became involved with the rehabilitation of injured and orphaned wildlife through her Prairie Wildlife Rehabilitation program while John turned to riding Quarter horses in Western riding competitions. In 1987, he won the National Reining Horse Association Novice Horse Non-Pro World Championship. He rode well into his 70s, competing in cutting horse competitions at the Illinois State Fair and other shows in the Midwest. After he stopped competing, Rotz continued to participate in special fundraising events with other active and retired top jockeys to support the Permanently Disabled Jockeys Fund.

John Rotz died peacefully on July 12, 2021, at age 86 at his farm in Warrensburg, Illinois.

Honors
John Rotz was inducted in the United States' National Museum of Racing and Hall of Fame in 1983.

Rotz, 1952 graduate, received a Warrensburg-Latham H.S. "Distinguished Alumni" Award in 1985... given by the W-L Education Foundation.

References

 John L. Rotz at the United States' National Museum of Racing and Hall of Fame

1934 births
2021 deaths
American jockeys
United States Thoroughbred Racing Hall of Fame inductees
People from Macon County, Illinois